"Forgive Me" is a song by American R&B duo Chloe x Halle from their second studio album Ungodly Hour (2020). It was released as the third single on June 12, 2020, with an accompanying music video for the song being released on the same day of the single's release. The song was written by the duo, alongside Nija Charles and Sounwave. It was produced by Sounwave and Jake One.

Composition
"Forgive Me" is an uptempo trap-pop and R&B song that runs for 2 minutes and 37 seconds. Lyrically, the song drives the message of being completely unapologetic in who you are and feeling self-empowered, regardless of who accepts or rejects it. "Forgive Me" comes on after the album's intro which opens with an "angelic" choral delivery and serves as the opening for the song. It is led into by the album's signature message, "Don't ever ask for permission, Ask for forgiveness", extending upon the moody backdrop first established by the intro. "So forgive me, forgive me, I been goin' too hard in your city", Chloe x Halle sing on the chorus. "So forgive me 'cause I'm not teary, best believe I'll move onto better things". Of the 13 songs, the duo told CBS News that the song defines the entire album.

Music video
The music video for "Forgive Me" was released on June 12, 2020, the same day the album came out. The video is "dark and moody" and features special effects intermixed with choreography.

Critical reception
Sidney Madden of NPR said the duo deliver a "scorcher", with harmonizing vocals, calling the track an early album favorite. Madden further described it as "a celebration of maturity matched with sex appeal that comes as a needed break from the severity of life". Jessica McKinney of Complex listed "Forgive Me" among the best new music of the week, stating: the "sultry and soothing melodies over Sounwave's bass-filled beat is what will make this a fan favorite".

Live performances 
Chloe x Halle performed "Forgive Me" for the first time on June 29, 2020 at the BET Awards 2020.

Charts

References

Songs written by Sounwave
Chloe x Halle songs
2020 songs
2020 singles
Songs written by Chloe Bailey
Songs written by Halle Bailey
Songs written by Nija Charles
Columbia Records singles
Trap music songs